William Ecclestone (1873 – 1937) was an English professional footballer who played as a wing half.

References

1873 births
1937 deaths
Footballers from Preston, Lancashire
English footballers
Association football wing halves
Grimsby Town F.C. players
Preston North End F.C. players
Kettering Town F.C. players
Oldham Athletic A.F.C. players
Barrow A.F.C. players
Lancaster F.C. players
Clitheroe F.C. players
English Football League players